John C. Davis was a labor economist and was U.S. President Harry S. Truman's chief of staff of the Council of Economic Advisers. His son is Rennie Davis.

References

Year of birth missing
Year of death missing
Labor economists
United States Council of Economic Advisers
American economists